Una Jagose   is a lawyer and King's Counsel from New Zealand.

Jagose was born and raised in Cambridge, New Zealand. Her parents were both medical professionals who had emigrated to New Zealand: her father was a Parsi doctor from India and her mother a nurse from Ireland.

Jagose studied law at the University of Otago followed by a postgraduate degree, also in law, at Victoria University of Wellington. She was admitted to the bar in 1990 and joined the then Ministry of Consumer Affairs before moving to the Ministry of Fisheries where she was appointed Chief Legal Advisor in 1999. Jagose joined Crown Law in 2002 and was appointed Deputy Solicitor-General in 2012. She was appointed Acting Director of the Government Communications Security Bureau in 2015, then as the Solicitor-General in February 2016 and as a Queen's Counsel in June 2016.

In 2020, Jagose won the Public Policy category of the New Zealand Women of Influence Awards.

References

Living people
New Zealand King's Counsel
21st-century New Zealand lawyers
University of Otago alumni
Solicitors-General of New Zealand
Victoria University of Wellington alumni
People from Cambridge, New Zealand
Year of birth missing (living people)
New Zealand Women of Influence Award recipients
New Zealand people of Indian descent